The Protestant Church in Hesse and Nassau (EKHN) is a United Protestant church body in the German states of Hesse and Rhineland-Palatinate. There is no bishop and therefore no cathedral. One of its most prominent churches is Katharinenkirche in Frankfurt am Main.

Dating back to the union in the Duchy of Nassau in August 1817, before the Prussian Union of September 1817, it is the first United and uniting church in the world. The EKHN is a full member of the Evangelical Church in Germany (EKD), and is based on the teachings brought forward by Martin Luther during the Reformation. It is a united church, combining both Calvinist and Lutheran traditions. Member of the Reformed Alliance in Germany. The Protestant Church in Hesse and Nassau is one of 20 churches in the EKD, has 1,446,971 members in 1,184 parishes (December, 2020). The territory of the EKHN includes the territories of the former People's State of Hesse and the Prussian Wiesbaden Region, which now form the southern and western part of the German state of Hesse and portions of the German state  of Rhineland-Palatinate (Rhenish Hesse). It's the most important Protestant denomination in this area. The church is a member of the Community of Protestant Churches in Europe.

Management and Administration

Institutions of the EKHN are the Church Synod, the church leadership and the church president, who is elected by the General Synod for eight years.

Church Presidents

 1947–1964: Martin Niemöller
 1964–1968: 
 1969–1985: 
 1985–1992: 
 1993–2008: 
 2009–2017:

History 
The Protestant Church of Hesse and Nassau was founded in 1946 and 1947 through a merger of three other formerly independent churches: Protestant Church in Hesse, Protestant Church in Nassau, Protestant Church in Frankfurt.

Academy

Practices 
Ordination of women and blessing of same-sex unions were allowed in 2013.

References

External links

 
 The Protestant Church in Hesse and Nassau (EKHN)
 Evangelical Church in Germany

Hesse
HesseNassau
HesseNassau
HesseNassau
HesseNassau